In music, Op. 18 stands for Opus number 18. Compositions that are assigned this number include:

 Balakirev – Islamey
 Beethoven – String Quartets Nos. 1–6, Op. 18
 Berlioz – Tristia
 Brahms – String Sextet No. 1
 Britten – Les Illuminations
 Chopin – Grande valse brillante in E-flat major
 Finzi – Let Us Garlands Bring
 Mendelssohn – String Quintet No. 1
 Nielsen – Søvnen
 Oswald – Piano Quintet
 Rachmaninoff – Piano Concerto No. 2
 Ries – Violin Sonata No. 9
 Schoenberg – Die glückliche Hand
 Schumann – Arabeske
 Strauss – Violin Sonata
 Tchaikovsky – The Tempest
 Zdeněk – The Bride of Messina
 Zemlinsky – Lyric Symphony